The Bahawal Stadium is a cricket ground in Bahawalpur, Punjab, Pakistan. Locally known as Dring Stadium, it is a multi-purpose stadium used mostly for cricket games. Situated on Stadium Road, opposite Bahawalpur Zoo, the stadium has a capacity of 15,000 people.

It is one of the stadiums in Asia that hold all games at one place. The stadium includes cricket, hockey, football, swimming, squash, judo, karate, swimming, gym, volleyball, tennis courts in it.

History 
The stadium was originally called Dring Stadium and was named after the second Prime Minister of Bahawalpur, Sir John Dring. Dring was Prime Minister under Nawab Sadiq V and served in this role from 1948 to 1952. Dring Stadium was ahead of its time and was the only complete stadium in Pakistan at the time.

International venue
It was the first cricket ground in West Pakistan to host a Test match, when it hosted the second Test of Indian cricket team in Pakistan in 1954–55, India's inaugural tour of Pakistan. However, this was the only Test match to be held at this ground. As of 2002, 155 first class matches and 23 List A matches have been played at this ground.

Present
As Bahawalpur's cricket team has been without first-class status since 2002–03, there was only one first-class match and one List A match here for the three seasons following that, but the ground still hosts Under-19 matches. Bahawal stadium was a war place before.

This stadium also ranked in Asia's second largest stadium by area.

International centuries
One Test century has been scored at the venue.

International five-wicket hauls
Two five-wicket hauls in Test matches have been taken at the venue.

See also
List of Test cricket grounds
 One-Test wonder
 List of stadiums in Pakistan
 List of cricket grounds in Pakistan
 List of sports venues in Karachi
 List of sports venues in Lahore
 List of sports venues in Faisalabad
 List of stadiums by capacity

References

Further references
 Bahawal Stadium, from cricinfo.com, retrieved 16 March 2006

Test cricket grounds in Pakistan
Buildings and structures in Bahawalpur
Pakistan
Stadiums in Pakistan
Football venues in Pakistan
Cricket grounds in Pakistan
Tourist attractions in Bahawalpur
Year of establishment missing